Chris van Abkoude (6 November 1880, Rotterdam – 2 January 1960, Portland, Oregon) was a Dutch writer and novelist of mostly children's books. He wrote the series of Pietje Bell novels from 1914 to 1936 and many books in between. He moved to the United States in 1916 and wrote all the Pietje Bell books in the United States, except for the first one, which he wrote in 1914 in Rotterdam. In 1923 Van Abkoude wrote the novel Kruimeltje (Little Crumb) and in 1999 the film Little Crumb was released. Before his writing career, Van Abkoude was a teacher; when he noticed the children did not like reading the children's books of the time, he wrote his own.

In the U.S., he anglicized his name to Charles Winters.

References 
 Digitale Bibliotheek voor de Nederlandse Letteren  - A website with information on him and his books

1880 births
1960 deaths
Dutch male novelists
Writers from Rotterdam
20th-century Dutch novelists
20th-century Dutch male writers
Dutch emigrants to the United States